Pulling is a surname. Notable people with the surname include:

 Abbi Pulling (born 2003), British racing driver
 James Pulling (1814–1879), British academic
 John Pulling (captain) (18th century), American army captain
 Mary Pulling (1871–1951), New Zealand headmistress
 Patricia Pulling (1948–1997), American anti-occult campaigner